Akbar Makhmoor Mughal (1956 – 2017), was a notable Saraiki-language poet and lexicographer and was known for compilation of 115,000 words of Saraiki words under title Saraiki Akhar Pothi. He lived in Saudi Arabia for 10 years where he worked as a labourer. He died at the age of 61.

Saraiki dictionary
He compiled following unpublished dictionary:
Saraiki Akhar Pothi

References

1956 births
2017 deaths
Saraiki-language poets
Pakistani lexicographers
People from Dera Ghazi Khan District
Pakistani expatriates in Saudi Arabia